St. John's Building is a skyscraper in Central on Hong Kong Island of Hong Kong. Owned and operated by Hongkong and Shanghai Hotels, it is built on the slope beside Garden Road and Cotton Tree Drive.  The ground floor serves as the Garden Road terminus of the Peak Tram.

History
In 1889, the Garden Road station for the Peak Tram opened. In 1935, a new lower terminus was built along with the St John's Apartments: a reinforced concrete building, with eight studio flats and a two-bedroom penthouse. In 1964, the apartments were demolished and a modern 14-storey commercial and residential building was erected in its place.

This was in turn replaced by the current 22-storey building. This building won the Silver Medal of the Hong Kong Institute of Architects in 1983. It was designed by Kwan, Ng, Wong & Associates and built by Hip Hing Construction.

References 

Office buildings in Hong Kong
Central, Hong Kong